Granholm is a Swedish-language surname, more common in Finland than in Sweden.

Geographical distribution
As of 2014, 36.7% of all known bearers of the surname Granholm were residents of Finland (frequency 1:5,394), 30.1% of Sweden (1:11,750), 24.9% of the United States (1:522,795), 4.3% of Canada (1:306,650) and 1.8% of Denmark (1:110,677).

In Finland, the frequency of the surname was higher than national average (1:5,394) in the following regions:
 1. Ostrobothnia (1:309)
 2. Åland (1:1,468)
 3. Satakunta (1:3,618)
 4. Central Ostrobothnia (1:3,934)

In Sweden, the frequency of the surname was higher than national average (1:11,750) in the following counties:
 1. Västernorrland County (1:2,178)
 2. Uppsala County (1:5,299)
 3. Västerbotten County (1:5,876)
 4. Södermanland County (1:6,205)
 5. Dalarna County (1:6,508)
 6. Västmanland County (1:7,629)
 7. Gotland County (1:8,354)
 8. Stockholm County (1:8,730)

People
 Jennifer Granholm (b. 1959), US politician
 Nels H. Granholm, for whom Mount Granholm in Antarctica was named
 Svante Granholm (b. 1947), Swedish hockey player

References

Swedish-language surnames